SCX may refer to:

 SCXA and SCXB, genes encoding the transcription factor Scleraxis
 Elan SCX, a model of alpine ski
 L. S. Starrett Company, NYSE ticker symbol
 Salina Cruz Airport, IATA code
 Scott Municipal Airport, FAA LID code
 Strong Cation Exchange chromatography, a type of reversed-phase chromatography
 Sun Country Airlines, ICAO code
 Oldsmobile Achieva#SCX automobile